SpartanNash (formerly Spartan Stores, Nash Finch) is an American food distributor and grocery store retailer headquartered in Byron Center, Michigan. The company's core businesses include distributing food to independent grocers, military commissaries, and corporate-owned retail stores in 44 states, Europe, Latin America, and the Middle East. SpartanNash operates 142 corporate-owned retail stores under a number of brands located in North Dakota, South Dakota, Nebraska, Minnesota, Iowa, Indiana, Wisconsin, Michigan, and Ohio, many of which were local grocery chains acquired by SpartanNash. In terms of revenue, it is the largest food distributor serving military commissaries and exchanges in the United States. It is known for its Our Family line of products and formerly the "Spartan" line of products.

History
The Grand Rapids Wholesale Grocery Company was founded in 1917 and assumed the Spartan Stores name in 1957. For most of its history, Spartan was a cooperative. Spartan changed to for-profit in the 1970s and was first traded on the NASDAQ in August 2000.

D&W Food Centers began using Spartan as a supply in 1961 following soon supplied with Spartan and D&W private label products. In 2000, D&W switched to Supervalu.

In 2000, Spartan Stores bought the Seaway Foodtown company whose operations included 47 Food Town Supermarkets and 26 The Pharm deep-discount drugstores. By 2003, the company had discontinued Food Town operations.

In 2005, Spartan was expected to purchase Farmer Jack, but did not consider the chain a good acquisition. The company agreed to acquire D&W Food Centers, Inc. in March 2006. 

In 2007, Spartan acquired the Felpausch chain consisting of 20 stores, nine with in-house pharmacies, three convenience stores, and two fuel centers. In February 2011, the last Felpausch in Coldwater, Michigan switched over to the Family Fare name.
 
In April 2008, Spartan announced that the store and customer lists of 12 of the 14 remaining Pharm stores would be sold to Rite Aid. The remaining two Michigan stores were sold in separate transactions. Industry experts said Rite Aid would likely keep the stores open and convert them to its own format and brand. In October 2008, Spartan announced it would purchase VGs Grocery and Pharmacy stores in Michigan.

13 Glen's Markets in Northern Michigan began undergoing conversion to the Family Fare name starting in May 2013. Three new Valu Land stores were also opened in 2013.

SpartanNash

In 2013, Spartan Stores and Nash Finch merged and formed SpartanNash company. The official name change was to occur May 2014, while continuing to operate as Spartan Stores, Nash Finch and MDV in their prior markets.

On January 9, 2017, SpartanNash completed its acquisition of Catio Foods and Blue Ribbon Transport (BRT).

In March 2017, it was announced that David Staples would replace Dennis Edison as chief executive officer of SpartanNash. Edison continued as the chairman of the company's board of directors after he retired as CEO in late May. , the CEO is Tony B. Sarsam.

In 2018, SpartanNash announced to their Fergus Falls Sun Mart employees on June 15, that the location would be aiming for a July 14 closure. Also in 2018, the Spartan brand in Michigan was dropped and replaced by the Our Family brand on private label products.

On December 31, 2018, SpartanNash completed its acquisition of South Bend, Indiana-based Martin's Super Markets.

Retail chains

Current

 Ada Fresh Market by Forest Hills Foods – Ada, Michigan
 D&W Fresh Markets – Michigan
 Dan's Supermarket – North Dakota
 Dillonvale IGA – Cincinnati, Ohio
 Family Fare Supermarkets – Minnesota, Nebraska, North Dakota, Michigan, South Dakota, and Wisconsin
 Family Fresh Market – Minnesota, Nebraska, and Wisconsin
 Forest Hills Foods – Grand Rapids, Michigan
 Fresh Madison Market – Madison, Wisconsin
 Martin's Super Markets – Indiana and Michigan
 No Frills Supermarkets – Iowa and Nebraska
 SunMart – Nebraska
 Supermercado Nuestra Familia – Omaha, Nebraska
 VG's – Michigan
Source:

Former
 Bag 'N Save (1981–2015) switched over to the Family Fare name.
 Econofoods – Minnesota and Wisconsin (until 2021)
 Felpausch (2007–2011) switched over to the Family Fare name.
 Food Town Supermarkets (2000–2003)
 Glen's Markets (1999–2014)
 The Pharm (2000–2008) drug stores and fuel centers
 Pick'n Save – Ironton, Ohio
 Valuland – Michigan

References

External links
 SpartanNash Company

Companies based in Kent County, Michigan
Economy of the Midwestern United States
Supermarkets of the United States
Retail companies established in 1917
Companies listed on the Nasdaq
Former cooperatives of the United States
1917 establishments in Michigan